The 2016 WGC-Cadillac Championship was a golf tournament which was played March 3–6 on the TPC Blue Monster course at Trump National Doral in Doral, Florida, a suburb west of Miami. It was the 17th WGC-Cadillac Championship tournament, the first of the World Golf Championships events in 2016, and the final edition of the tournament played in Doral. The tournament was won by Adam Scott.

Course layout
The tournament was played on the TPC Blue Monster course.

Field
The field consisted of players from the top of the Official World Golf Ranking and the money lists/Orders of Merit from the six main professional golf tours. Each player is classified according to the first category in which he qualified, but other categories are shown in parentheses.

Five players made their WGC debut: Kristoffer Broberg, Nathan Holman, Smylie Kaufman, Yūsaku Miyazato, and Jordan Zunic.

1. The top 30 players from the final 2015 FedExCup Points List
Daniel Berger, Steven Bowditch, Paul Casey (7,9), Jason Day (7,9), Harris English, Rickie Fowler (7,9), Bill Haas (7,9), Charley Hoffman, J. B. Holmes (7,9), Dustin Johnson (7,9), Zach Johnson (7,9), Kevin Kisner (7,9,10), Brooks Koepka (7,9), Matt Kuchar (7,9), Danny Lee (7,9), Hideki Matsuyama (7,9), Rory McIlroy (2,7.9), Kevin Na (7,9,10), Louis Oosthuizen (2,7,9), Scott Piercy (7,9), Patrick Reed (2,7,9), Justin Rose (2,7,9), Brandt Snedeker (7,9,10), Jordan Spieth (7,9), Henrik Stenson (2,7,8,9), Robert Streb (7,9), Jimmy Walker (7,9), Bubba Watson (7,9)
Bae Sang-moon was unable to compete due to a military obligation in South Korea.
Jim Furyk (7,9) was unable to compete due to wrist surgery.

2. The top 20 players from the final 2015 European Tour Race to Dubai
An Byeong-hun (7,8,9), Kiradech Aphibarnrat (7,9), Kristoffer Broberg, Victor Dubuisson (7,9), Ross Fisher, Matt Fitzpatrick (7,9), Branden Grace (7,8,9), Søren Kjeldsen (7,9), Anirban Lahiri (6,7,9), Shane Lowry (7,9), Andy Sullivan (7,8,9), Bernd Wiesberger (7,9), Danny Willett (7,8,9), Chris Wood (7,8,9)
Thongchai Jaidee (7,9) did not play.

3. The top 2 players from the final 2015 Japan Golf Tour Order of Merit
Kim Kyung-tae, Yūsaku Miyazato

4. The top 2 players from the final 2015 PGA Tour of Australasia Order of Merit
Nathan Holman (8), Jordan Zunic

5. The top 2 players from the final 2015 Sunshine Tour Order of Merit
George Coetzee, Charl Schwartzel (7,8,9)

6. The top 2 players from the final 2015 Asian Tour Order of Merit
Scott Hend

7. The top 50 players from the Official World Golf Ranking, as of February 22, 2016
Jamie Donaldson,  Sergio García (9), Emiliano Grillo (9), Billy Horschel (9), Martin Kaymer (9), Russell Knox (9,10), Marc Leishman (9), David Lingmerth (9), Phil Mickelson (9), Adam Scott (9,10), Justin Thomas (9,10)

8. The top 10 players from the 2016 European Tour Race to Dubai, as of February 22, 2016
Rafa Cabrera-Bello, Marcus Fraser

9. The top 50 players from the Official World Golf Ranking, as of February 29, 2016
Jaco van Zyl did not play.

10. The top 10 players from the 2016 FedExCup Points List, as of February 29, 2016
Jason Dufner, Fabián Gómez, Smylie Kaufman, Graeme McDowell

Round summaries

First round
Thursday, March 3, 2016

Marcus Fraser and Scott Piercy shot rounds of 66 (−6) to take a one-shot lead over Phil Mickelson.

Second round
Friday, March 4, 2016

Adam Scott shot a 66 (−6) to take a two-stroke lead over Dustin Johnson and Rory McIlroy. Johnson, the defending champion, shot the low round of the day, an 8-under-par 64. First round co-leaders Marcus Fraser and Scott Piercy both shot 77 to fall down the leaderboard.

Third round
Saturday, March 5, 2016

Rory McIlroy took a three-stroke lead over Dustin Johnson and Adam Scott by shooting at 4-under-par 68.

Final round
Sunday, March 6, 2016

Adam Scott recovered from two double bogeys in his first five holes with six birdies the rest of the round to prevail by one stroke over Bubba Watson. Rory McIlroy entered the round with a three-stroke lead but recorded three bogeys and failed to make birdie until the 16th to finish two shots behind Scott. The victory was Scott's second consecutive win on the PGA Tour, having won The Honda Classic the week before.

Scorecard

Final round

References

External links

Coverage on the European Tour's official site

WGC Championship
Golf in Florida
WGC-Cadillac Championship
WGC-Cadillac Championship
WGC-Cadillac Championship
WGC-Cadillac Championship